Construction (Design & Management) may refer to:

 Construction (Design and Management) Regulations 2007
 Construction (Design and Management) Regulations 2015